Dennis Smarsch (born 14 January 1999) is a German professional footballer who plays as a goalkeeper for FC St. Pauli.

Career

Hertha BSC
Smarsch joined Hertha on 27 September 2017. He made his professional debut on 24 November 2019, when he came on as a substitute after the dismissal of Rune Jarstein in the 28th minute of Hertha's 4–0 defeat at FC Augsburg; they were 2–0 down at the time he came on.

FC St. Pauli
On 2 August 2020, Smarsch joined 2. Bundesliga side FC St. Pauli on a free transfer. He signed a three-year contract.

Career statistics

References

External links 
 Profile on the official FC St. Pauli website 
 

1999 births
Living people
Footballers from Berlin
German footballers
Association football goalkeepers
Bundesliga players
2. Bundesliga players
Hertha BSC players
FC St. Pauli players